Alistair Robert Gunn (2 November 1924 – 3 April 2010) was a professional footballer, who played for Dundee, Huddersfield Town, Bournemouth & Boscombe Athletic & Arbroath. He was born in Broughty Ferry, Dundee, Scotland.

References

Sources

1924 births
2010 deaths
Scottish footballers
Footballers from Dundee
Association football wingers
English Football League players
Dundee F.C. players
Huddersfield Town A.F.C. players
AFC Bournemouth players
Arbroath F.C. players
Scottish Football League players
People from Broughty Ferry